The cartography of Sri Lanka is the history of the surveying and creation of maps of Sri Lanka. A list of maps of Sri Lanka in chronological order is shown below.

Maps

Small-scale maps

References

 
Maps
History of Sri Lanka
Sri Lanka
Sri Lanka